Bill Spence may refer to:
 Bill Spence (footballer) (1929–1993), English footballer
 Bill Spence (musician) (1940-2019), American hammered dulcimer player
 Bill Spence (racing driver) (1906–1929), American racecar driver
 Bill Spence (writer) (born 1923), English writer

See also
 Billy Spence (died 1980), Northern Ireland activist
 William Spence (disambiguation)